Pragersko railway station is a significant railway station in Pragersko, Slovenia. It forms the junction between the main line from Ljubljana to Maribor, and the line from Pragersko to Čakovec in Croatia. It is currently being upgraded.

External links 

Official site of the Slovenian railways 

Railway stations in Slovenia